Vanessa Meloche (born July 16, 1985) is a Canadian gymnast and 2002 Canadian National Uneven Bars Champion.

During most of her competitive career, Vanessa trained at Parkettes in Allentown, Pennsylvania.

Currently Vanessa competes for the University of Nebraska.

References 
 Vanessa Meloche's Biography at the University of Nebraska

1985 births
Living people
Canadian female artistic gymnasts
Parkettes
University of Nebraska alumni
Gymnasts at the 2002 Commonwealth Games
Commonwealth Games bronze medallists for Canada
Commonwealth Games medallists in gymnastics
20th-century Canadian women
21st-century Canadian women
Medallists at the 2002 Commonwealth Games